Steven Jack Bush (born July 4, 1974 in Paradise Valley, Arizona) is a former tight end and fullback in the NFL. He went to Arizona State University.

Bush was signed as an undrafted free agent by the Cincinnati Bengals in 1997. After several years with the team playing mostly on special teams, he was signed by the St. Louis Rams during the 2001 offseason, but was cut before the end of training camp. He was then picked up by the Arizona Cardinals, where he played at both tight end and special teams. After being released by the Cardinals before the start of the 2004 season, he was signed by the 49ers in December 2004. As a member of the 49ers, he has seen starting time as both fullback and tight end, and has been a boost on special teams, providing key blocks for the return men.

References

External links
Player Profile

1974 births
Living people
Players of American football from Phoenix, Arizona
American football running backs
American football tight ends
Arizona Cardinals players
Arizona State Sun Devils football players
Cincinnati Bengals players
San Francisco 49ers players
Miami Dolphins coaches